Doubabougou  is a village and rural commune in the Cercle of Kati in the Koulikoro Region of south-western Mali. The commune contains 6 villages and had a population of 5,041 at the time of the 2009 census.

References

External links
.

Communes of Koulikoro Region